The 1972 European Sambo Championships was the first International Sambo competition of its kind and it was held in Riga, Latvia.

Medal overview

References

European Sambo Championships
1972 in sambo (martial art)
International sports competitions hosted by Latvia
Sports competitions in Riga